Azra Mansoor is a Pakistani actress and radio artist. She is active in the industry since last five decades and appeared in television series such as Ankahi (1982), Sunehray Din (1991), Alif Allah Aur Insaan (2017), Khamoshi (2017) and Paristan (2022). She also appeared in the film Bin Roye (2015).

Early life 

Mansoor was born in Lahore and studied from different cities, being the daughter of an army officer. She did his schooling from Convent of Saint Joseph, Comilla and then did her matriculation from Government High School, Malir Town. She did her graduation from Women College, Quetta.

Career 

Mansoor made her debut with PTV's Kaghaz Ke Phool (1967) with the lead role. She then appeared in PTV's classics such as Ankahi (1982) and Sunehray Din (1991). Her recent performances include Bin Roye (2015), Alif Allah Aur Insaan and Khamoshi (both 2017).

Filmography

Film
 Bin Roye (2015)

Television

References

External links 
 

Living people
Year of birth missing (living people)
Pakistani television actresses
Pakistani film actresses